The São Bento River is a river of Santa Catarina state in southeastern Brazil. It is part of the Uruguay River basin and is a tributary of the Do Peixe River.

See also
List of rivers of Santa Catarina

References
 Map from Ministry of Transport

Rivers of Santa Catarina (state)